Jean-Claude Marobe (born 18 June 1993) is a Malagasy football defender for Fosa Juniors FC.

References

1993 births
Living people
Malagasy footballers
Madagascar international footballers
Fosa Juniors FC players
AS Adema players
People from Toamasina
Association football defenders